Lunella is a genus of sea snails, marine gastropod mollusks in the family Turbinidae, the turban snails.

The Australian Faunal Directory classifies Lunella as Turbo (Lunella) Röding, 1798

Species
Species within the genus Lunella include:
 Lunella cinerea (Born, 1778)
 Lunella coronata (Gmelin, 1791)
 Lunella correensis (Récluz, 1853)
 Lunella granulata (Gmelin, 1791)
 Lunella jungi (Lai, 2006)
 Lunella moniliformis Röding, 1798 
 Lunella ogasawarana Tomoyulo Nakano, Kyoko Takashashi & Tomowo Ozawa, 2007
 Lunella smaragda (Gmelin, 1791)
 Lunella torquata (Gmelin, 1791)
 Lunella undulata (Lightfoot, 1786)
 Lunella viridicallus (Jousseaume, 1898)

References

 Thiele, J. (1929-1935). Handbuch der systematischen Weichtierkunde. Jena, Gustav Fischer, 1154 pp
 Vaught, K.C. (1989). A classification of the living Mollusca. American Malacologists: Melbourne, FL (USA). . XII, 195 pp.
 Williams, S.T. (2007). Origins and diversification of Indo-West Pacific marine fauna: evolutionary history and biogeography of turban shells (Gastropoda, Turbinidae). Biological Journal of the Linnean Society, 2007, 92, 573–592

External links
 Röding P.F. (1798). Museum Boltenianum sive Catalogus cimeliorum e tribus regnis naturæ quæ olim collegerat Joa. Fried Bolten, M. D. p. d. per XL. annos proto physicus Hamburgensis. Pars secunda continens Conchylia sive Testacea univalvia, bivalvia & multivalvia. Trapp, Hamburg. viii, 199 pp.
 Gray, J. E. (1850). [text. In: Gray, M. E., Figures of molluscous animals, selected from various authors. Longman, Brown, Green and Longmans, London. Vol. 4, iv + 219 pp. (August) [Frontispiece (portrait of Mrs. Gray); pp. ii–iv (preface); 1–62 (explanation of plates 1–312 in Volumes 1–3); pp. 63–124 (systematic arrangement of figures); 127–219 (reprint of Gray 1847)]
 Williams, S.T. (2007). Origins and diversification of Indo-West Pacific marine fauna: evolutionary history and biogeography of turban shells (Gastropoda, Turbinidae). Biological Journal of the Linnean Society, 2007, 92, 573–592

 
Turbinidae
Gastropod genera